J. Harrison Ghee is an American actor, singer, and dancer, best known for their work on Broadway. They originated the role of Andre Mayem in Mrs. Doubtfire, a role they also played in the 5th Avenue Theatre out of town engagement in 2019. They have also received recognition for their performance as Lola in Kinky Boots. In December 2022, they originated the role of Jerry/Daphne in Some Like It Hot, a stage musical based on the film of the same name.

Early life 
Ghee grew up the child of a Southern Baptist pastor and an educator in Fayetteville, North Carolina.  They began playing cello in middle school, later switching to play the bass. Ghee then learned to play trombone, so that they could be in the E. E. Smith High School marching band. After graduating high school in 2007, Ghee attended the American Musical and Dramatic Academy. Ghee first tried drag in college when they played a female wrestler.

Personal Life 
Ghee is non-binary,<ref>{{Cite web |title=My name is J. Harrison Ghee, I was born and raised in North Carolina but currently reside in New York City. Music and art have always been my passion and ministry, I grew up singing in church. Moving to NY was not only my choice for studying musical theater, but it was a place I've always been drawn to for the expression and freedom that I felt it embodied. I live by the mantra "Do everything in life with intention and purpose, but most importantly love" and I try my best to share that in all that I do. As a nonbinary pansexual black artist, I hope that in my daily life I can be an example of freedom and fabulousity and inspire someone else to walk in their truth. I used to say I wasn't a political person until I saw a quote from Toni Morrison saying "all good art is political. So every day of my life I know that my existence is a political statement and I must make a difference in this world. To follow their work, follow instagram.com/jharrisonghee.... - The Lesbian, Gay, Bisexual & Transgender Community Center |url=https://www.facebook.com/lgbtcenternyc/photos/a.192751068969/10159913744378970/?type=3 |access-date=2023-02-04 |website=www.facebook.com |language=en}}</ref> and uses he/they pronouns.

 Theatrical career 
Ghee began working professionally at Tokyo Disneyland and on cruise ships. While in Tokyo, Ghee began creating their drag persona, Crystal Demure. When Ghee went to audition for Motown, they took the opportunity to share with the casting directors, who also worked on Kinky Boots, their story and connection with the Kinky Boots character Lola and were eventually cast as Lola in their Broadway debut. Ghee was the first established drag performer to take on the role. Ghee eventually joined the national touring production of the show.

Ghee joined the cast of Mrs. Doubtfire, and began previews before the 2020 closing of Broadway. In 2021, Ghee performed as Velma Kelly in The Muny's production of Chicago, before originating the role of Andre when Mrs. Doubtfire opened.

In 2022, Ghee joined the cast of Some Like It Hot''. They are playing Jerry/Daphne, the role played by Jack Lemmon in the film.

Notes

References

External links 
 
 

Actors from North Carolina
Year of birth missing (living people)
Living people
American stage actors
21st-century American actors
American Musical and Dramatic Academy alumni
American non-binary actors